Arihiro is an uncommon Japanese given name that can be given to a boy. "Arihiro" can also be a surname.

People 

, Japanese voice actor
, Japanese actor and voice actor
, Japanese historian and professor

Japanese masculine given names